Nickel(II) laurate is an metal-organic compound with the chemical formula . It is classified as a metallic soap, i.e. a metal derivative of a fatty acid (lauric acid).

Preparation
Reaction of acqueos solutions of nickel salt and soluble laurate. Nickel(II) laurate forms  green precipitate.

References

Laurates
Nickel compounds